The Reno Gazette Journal is the main daily newspaper for Reno, Nevada. It is owned and operated by the Gannett Company. It came into being when the Nevada State Journal (founded on November 23, 1870) and the Reno Evening Gazette (founded on March 28, 1876) were combined on October 7, 1983.

Speidel Newspapers bought the Gazette on October 1, 1939 and bought the Journal a month later. Gannett bought Speidel Newspapers on May 11, 1977.

On April 16, 2019, an edition of the Nevada State Journal was found during the opening of a time capsule from 1872 in the cornerstone of a demolished Masonic lodge in Reno.

References

External links

 

1870 establishments in Nevada
Daily newspapers published in the United States
Gannett publications
Mass media in Reno, Nevada
Newspapers published in Nevada
Publications established in 1870